Sowmaeh Zarrin may refer to:
 Sowmaeh Zarrin, Sarab
 Sowmaeh Zarrin, Mehraban, Sarab County